The Grom-class destroyers were two destroyers, built for the Polish Navy by the British company of J. Samuel White, Cowes. They were laid down in 1935 and commissioned in 1937. The two Groms were some of the fastest and most heavily armed destroyers of World War II.

Design
Despite having ordered its previous pair of destroyers ( and ) from France, a country with which it had strong ties, Poland decided to acquire the second pair from the United Kingdom, possibly in recognition of the excellence of British destroyer designs at the time. The selected design resulted in large and powerful ships, superior to German and Soviet destroyers of the time, and comparable to the famous British  of 1936.

However, the guns were not British, but were instead Swedish Bofors 50cal QF M34/36, the same as those used previously on the minelayer .

Approximate cost for refurbishing of the ORP Blyskawica is around 650million zlotys.

Original Grom class
There were two ships built:
  - Sunk on 4 May 1940 in Ofotfjord near Narvik
  - Currently preserved as a museum ship in Gdynia

Improved Grom class

Two more ships of this class (Huragan and Orkan) were ordered in 1939 to be built in Gdynia, but war broke out soon after the first was laid down. They would have been the first major modern warships to be built in Poland.

Operational service

Just before the war broke out, the two destroyers were evacuated to Britain to fight alongside the Royal Navy.  Since they were designed for Baltic operations, they had to be modified soon after their arrival there to improve stability, to enable them to operate successfully in the rough waters of the North Sea and the Atlantic.  Grom was lost in this state in 1940. In December 1941 the remaining ship, Błyskawica, had the original 4.7 inch guns replaced by eight 4-inch (102 mm) guns in twin mountings.  Various other modifications of armaments and sensors were made as the war progressed.

Specifications
Displacement: 2,144t, 2,560t full load
Dimensions: 114 m x 11.3 m x 3.3 m
Armament (initial): 7-4.7 in (120 mm) (3 × 2,1 × 1), 4–40 mm AA (2 × 2), 8 13,2 mm MG (4 × 2), 6-21 in (533 mm) TT (2 × 3), DCTs
Propulsion: 54,000 shp Parson geared turbine engines = 39 kt
Complement: 192

References

Destroyer classes